Okan International University was a private university in Dania Beach, Florida, offering bachelor's and master's degree programs.

History
OIU was founded in 2015. Its main campus is in Dania Beach, Florida, just north of Miami.

Curricula

Okan International University (OIU) offers bachelor's and master's degree programs.
 B.A. – Business Management
 B.A. – Healthcare Management
 B.A. – Hospitality and Tourism Management
 M.B.A. – Master of Business Management
 M.A. – Healthcare Management
 M.A. – Hospitality and Tourism Management

Accreditation
OIU is licensed by Florida Department of Education.

OIU is accredited by the Accrediting Commission of Career Schools and Colleges, Alexandria, VA. meeting the requirements of the U.S. Department of Education and SEVIS administered by the  U.S. Department of Homeland Security.

Okan is a member of the Florida Association of Postsecondary Schools and Colleges.

In July 2017, Okan International University applied to the Florida Board of Nursing for LPN/RN, Bachelors of Nursing and Masters of Nursing Degree Programs.

References

External links
 

Defunct private universities and colleges in Florida